Ketil Thorkelsson, better known by his nickname Ketil Trout or Ketil Salmon was a Norwegian military commander (hersir) of the late ninth century who settled in Iceland around 900 CE. He appears in  Egils saga, the Landnámabók, and other Icelandic sources.

Biography
Ketil was the son of Hrafnhild (daughter of Ketil Trout of Hrafnista) and Thorkel, jarl of Namdalen. Ketil was a man of great wealth and a close friend and kinsman of Thorolf Kveldulfsson and his brother Skallagrim. With his wife Ingunn, Ketil had several children, including Storolf, Herjolf, Helgi, Vestar, and Hrafn Hængsson, the last of whom was one of the first lawspeakers.

A place pivotal in the life of Ketil was an estate named Torgar,. The estate had passed from Ketil's uncle by marriage, Brynjolf,) to his son Bard "the White" Brynjolfsson (Ketil's first cousin). Bard, in turn, bequeathed the estate to Thorolf Kveldulfsson and gave no share to his half-brothers, Harek and Hrærek (sons of Hildirid), whom he considered bastards. The sycophantic brothers, who were favorites of King Harald of Norway (Harald Fairhair; Harald hårfagre), had prevailed on Harald and persuaded him to confiscate Torgar from Thorolf and give it to them. Despite this, the brothers had continued to malign Thorolf's character and induced Harald to attack Thorolf. When Ketil heard of the campaign against Thorolf, he was among a group of Thorolf's allies who set out to support him. However, the expedition arrived too late, and Thorolf had been killed. In retaliation for Thorolf's death, Ketil gathered 60 warriors to raid Torgar and attack Harek and Hrærek. The brothers were killed and their property looted.

Following the events at Torgar, Ketil decided to emigrate to Iceland. His family and allies set sail on two large longships. For their first winter in Iceland, they settled on the eastern bank of the river Ytri-Rangá, but later moved eastwards and took land between "Þjórsá and Markarfljót  from fell to firth, and made his home at Hof (Hofi) ".

See also
Ketils saga hœngs

Explanatory notes

References
Citations

Bibliography

External links
Landnámabók, p. 28, on Ketil Salmon's settlement
Viking warriors
9th-century Icelandic people
10th-century Icelandic people
9th-century Vikings